In enzymology, a phytanoyl-CoA dioxygenase is an enzyme that catalyzes the chemical reaction

phytanoyl-CoA + 2-oxoglutarate + O2  2-hydroxyphytanoyl-CoA + succinate + CO2

The three substrates of this enzyme are phytanoyl-CoA, 2-oxoglutarate (2OG), and O2, whereas its three products are 2-hydroxyphytanoyl-CoA, succinate, and CO2.

This enzyme belongs to the family of iron(II)-dependent oxygenases, which typically incorporate one atom of dioxygen into the substrate and one atom into the succinate carboxylate group. The mechanism is complex, but is believed to involve ordered binding of 2-oxoglutarate to the iron(II) containing enzyme followed by substrate. Binding of substrate causes displacement of a water molecule from the iron(II) cofactor, leaving a vacant coordination position to which dioxygen binds. A rearrangement occurs to form a high energy iron-oxygen species (which is generally thought to be an iron(IV)=O species) that performs the actual oxidation reaction.

Nomenclature
The systematic name of this enzyme class is phytanoyl-CoA, 2-oxoglutarate:oxygen oxidoreductase (2-hydroxylating). This enzyme is also called phytanoyl-CoA hydroxylase and phytanoyl-CoA alpha-hydroxylase.

Examples
In humans, phytanoyl-CoA hydroxylase is encoded by the PHYH (aka PAHX) gene and is required for the alpha-oxidation of branched chain fatty acids (e.g. phytanic acid) in peroxisomes. PHYH deficiency results in the accumulation of large tissue stores of phytanic acid and is the major cause of Refsum disease.

Related enzymes
Iron(II) and 2OG-dependent oxygenases are common in microorganisms, plants, and animals; the human genome is predicted to contain about 80 examples, and the model plant Arabidopsis thaliana likely contains more. In plants and microorganisms this enzyme family is associated with a large diversity of oxidative reactions.

References

Further reading

External links 
 GeneReviews/NCBI/NIH/UW entry on Refsum Disease

EC 1.14.11
Enzymes of known structure